O Samba Poconé is the third studio album by Skank, released in 1996. It includes the hits "Garota Nacional" (which was also released in a Spanish-language version, "Chica Nacional") plus "Tão Seu", "Poconé" and "É Uma Partida de Futebol."
O Samba Poconé sold 1.8 million copies, with 800,000 in two months.

Track listing

"É Uma Partida de Futebol" (Nando Reis/Samuel Rosa) - 3:56 
"Eu Disse a Ela" (Chico Amaral/Samuel Rosa) - 4:14 
"Zé Trindade" (featuring Manu Chao) (Chico Amaral/Samuel Rosa) -  4:07
"Garota Nacional" (Chico Amaral/Samuel Rosa) -  5:17 
"Tão Seu" (Chico Amaral/Samuel Rosa) - 4:03 
"Sem Terra" (featuring Manu Chao) (Chico Amaral/Samuel Rosa) -  4:39
"Os Exilados" (Chico Amaral/Samuel Rosa) -  4:05
"Um Dia Qualquer" (Chico Amaral) -  4:52
"Los Pretos" (featuring Manu Chao) (Chico Amaral/Samuel Rosa) -  3:59
"Sul da América" (Chico Amaral/Samuel Rosa) - 4:14
"Poconé" (Chico Amaral) - 5:18

Personnel 
Skank
 Samuel Rosa - vocals, guitar
 Henrique Portugal - keyboards
 Lelo Zaneti - bass
 Haroldo Ferretti - drums

Additional musicians
 Manu Chao - vocals on "Zé Trindade", "Sem Terra" and "Los Pretos"
 Toninho Ferragutti - accordion
 Débora Reis, Graça Cunha, Kelly Cruz, Vânia Abreu - background vocals on "Eu Disse a Ela"
 Paco Pigalle - background vocals on "Los Pretos"
 Ed Côrtes, James Müller, Marcos Romera - percussion
 Chico Amaral, Proveta, Teco Cardoso - saxophone
 João Vianna, Nahor Gomes, Walmir Gil - trumpet
 Edivaldo Silva, Sidnei - trombone

Production
 Dudu Marote, Skank - production
 Chico Amaral - brass arrangement (except "É uma Partida de Futebol")
 Ed Côrtes - brass/percussion arrangement on "É uma Partida de Futebol"
 Guilherme Canaes - recording
 Michael Fossenkemper - mixing
 Leon Zervos - mastering
 Primo, Silas de Godoy - additional recording
 Steve Sola, Dominic Barbera - studio assistants: Soundtrack Studios
 Gauguin - technical consultant
 César Goulart, Marcelo Planetti, Tieta - production assistants

Design
 Gringo Cardia - artwork
 Jose Robles - painting
 Cláudia Stanciolli - art assistant
 Leonardo Eyer - CG, art assistant

Album certification

References

1996 albums
Skank (band) albums